Nuclear Nebraska: The Remarkable Story of the Little County That Couldn’t Be Bought is a 2007 book by Susan Cragin which follows the controversy about a proposed low level nuclear waste dump, which was planned for Boyd County, Nebraska. 
   
In 1989, two multinational corporations and several government agencies proposed a waste dump and offered payment of $3 million per year for 40 years. The residents of the Boyd County farming community resisted the offer and controversy followed for almost two decades. During this time, the community was transformed "from a small group of isolated farmers to a defiant band of environmentalists".  The opposition of the community eventually succeeded, and the license to build the dump was denied.

Several governors became embroiled in the controversy, as well as legislators, bureaucrats and the community. One central figure went to jail and others were dismissed from their jobs. For many years, there was extensive coverage of the event by the news media.

U.S. Senator Ben Nelson wrote the foreword to the book.

See also
List of books about nuclear issues
Central Interstate Low Level Radioactive Waste Compact

References

   

Environmental non-fiction books
2007 non-fiction books
2007 in the environment
Energy development
Radioactive waste
Anti–nuclear power movement
Boyd County, Nebraska
Books about nuclear issues
Books about multinational companies
Anti-nuclear movement in the United States
Books about Nebraska